The Zerega Avenue station is a local station on the IRT Pelham Line of the New York City Subway. Located at Zerega Avenue and Westchester Avenue in the Westchester Square section of the Bronx, it is served by the 6 train at all times except weekdays in the peak direction, when the <6> train takes over.


History

This station was built as part of the Pelham Line, which was part of the Dual Contracts, signed on March 19, 1913, and also known as the Dual Subway System. The Pelham Line was proposed to be a branch of the Lexington Avenue Line running northeast via 138th Street, Southern Boulevard and Westchester Avenue to Pelham Bay Park. This station opened on October 24, 1920, with the line's extension from East 177th Street to Westchester Square. Service was initially served by a mix of through and shuttle trains during the 1920s.

From July 5, 2014, to April 27, 2015, as part of a $109 million rebuilding project at five Pelham Line stations, this station, along with Buhre Avenue, was closed for station rehabilitation work.

Station layout

This elevated station has three tracks and two side platforms. The center track is not used in regular service.

It resembles other elevated stations along the line: it has wood mezzanines and no windscreens along the platform edges.

Exits

The station's only exit is a mezzanine beneath the tracks. Outside fare control, stairs lead to the northeast and southwest corners of Westchester Avenue and Zerega Avenue.

References

External links 

 
 Station Reporter — 6 Train
 The Subway Nut — Zerega Avenue Pictures
 Zerega Avenue entrance from Google Maps Street View
 Platforms from Google Maps Street View

IRT Pelham Line stations
New York City Subway stations in the Bronx
Railway stations in the United States opened in 1920
1920 establishments in New York City